Ibrianu may refer to several villages in Romania:

 Ibrianu, a village in Grădiștea, Brăila
 Ibrianu, a village in Cornești, Dâmbovița